The , shown on some maps as the Shirokita Central Park Kuirhara ruins, are the site of some ruins of a dwelling found in Nerima Ward, Tokyo, Japan. Today, a modern (1950s) reconstruction of a pit-house stands on the site and is registered as a historic site of Nerima Ward.

History 
The name Kurihara was that of a small administrative unit of a village that existed in the area. In a survey conducted between 1955 and 1956, stone tools made of obsidian were excavated from the red soil (Kantō Plain loam), and were found to be from the Paleolithic age. Also, Jōmon pottery has been excavated, showing that traces of pit living from the Yayoi to the Heian periods (300 BC–1185 AD) have been found. The reconstructed dwelling depicts a construction from around the beginning of the 8th century, the early Nara period (AD 710 to 794). The reconstruction was designed by Gaijiro Fujishima, then a professor at the University of Tokyo, in 1957.

Structure 
The remnants of the dwelling were dug down to a depth of 50 cm, and four pillar holes and a clay pot were identified to the north. When restoring the house, Japanese zelkova was used for the main pillar, and Japanese cedar was used for the beams and girders. The pit-house is surrounded by a metal fence and it is normally not possible to go inside.

Image gallery

References 
Tokyo Metropolitan Government’s webpage about the ruins

External links 

Nerima Ward’s webpage about the ruins
Shakuji Jimdo.com
Webpage on biglobe.ne.jp.com
 
Archaeological sites in Japan
Buildings and structures in Japan